The Flying Fruit Fly Circus School is the only primary and secondary-level circus school in Australia. It was founded in 1987 as the educational arm of The Flying Fruit Fly Circus.

The school was originally located on the grounds of Wodonga High School, but in 2003 a fire destroyed the entire Wodonga High School facility. Police considered the fire suspicious. The school was relocated to nearby Wodonga West Secondary College, now known as Wodonga Middle Years College Felltimber Campus due to a merging of the three public schools in Wodonga (Wodonga High School, Wodonga West Secondary College, and Mitchell Secondary College) in 2005–2006.

See also
Cirkidz
National Institute of Circus Arts
Lennon Bros Circus
The Flying Fruit Fly Circus

Notes

External links
 The Flying Fruit Fly Circus School

Private secondary schools in Victoria (Australia)
Circus schools
Educational institutions established in 1987
Schools of the performing arts in Australia
1987 establishments in Australia
Arts in Victoria (Australia)